Candleland is the debut solo album by Ian McCulloch, released 17 September 1989. This album marked McCulloch's departure from Echo & the Bunnymen in 1989. The album features a guest appearance by the Cocteau Twins' Elizabeth Fraser on the title song, "Candleland". The producer, and McCulloch's main musical collaborator on the album  was veteran producer, programmer, multi-instrumentalist, composer and vocalist Ray Shulman, bassist and main co-writer for noted 1970s progressive rock group Gentle Giant. The album reached number 18 on the UK Albums Chart and number 179 on the Billboard 200.

Track listing 
All tracks written by Ian McCulloch.

 "The Flickering Wall" – 3:35
 "The White Hotel" – 3:15
 "Proud to Fall" – 3:57
 "The Cape" – 4:09
 "Candleland" – 3:18
 "Horse's Head" – 4:47
 "Faith and Healing" – 4:36
 "I Know You Well" – 4:06
 "In Bloom" – 5:02
 "Start Again" – 5:00

Personnel 
 Ian McCulloch – vocals, guitar
 Ray Shulman – bass, keyboards, producer, programming
 Boris Williams – drums on "The White Hotel" and "Proud to Fall"
 Mike Jobson – bass on "The Flickering Wall" and "The White Hotel"
 Elizabeth Fraser – backing vocals on "Candleland"
 Dave Bascombe – remix on "Candleland"
 Billy McGee – string arrangement on "Horse's Head"
 Olle Romo – programming on "Horse's Head" and "Start Again"
 Henry Priestman – string arrangement on "I Know You Well"

References

External links 
 Candleland

1989 debut albums
Ian McCulloch (singer) albums
Sire Records albums